Jun Kikuchi (born 22 December 1973) is a Japanese professional golfer.

Kikuchi plays on the Japan Golf Tour, where he has won once.

Professional wins (1)

Japan Golf Tour wins (1)

Japan Golf Tour playoff record (1–0)

External links

Japanese male golfers
Japan Golf Tour golfers
Sportspeople from Saitama Prefecture
1973 births
Living people